John Hurst is an English former professional footballer. Born in Blackpool, Lancashire, Hurst joined the youth system for Everton, making his first team debut in the 1965–66 season. Originally a striker, Everton manager Harry Catterick made Hurst into a centre-half, a position in which he appeared in the 1968 FA Cup Final. He formed a defensive partnership with Brian Labone, the club captain of Everton at the time. Following the introduction of substitutes to English football in 1965 (for injury only) Hurst became Everton's first ever sub replacing Fred Pickering at Stoke City's Victoria Ground in August 1965. Everton won the league title in the 1969–70 season and Hurst was an ever-present during this campaign, making 42 appearances and contributing 5 goals. He also won the 1970 FA Charity Shield with Everton. Hurst was transferred to Oldham Athletic following the 1975–76 season.

After his playing career Hurst remained in the game, working as a coach at Everton, and as a scout for Manchester City, then managed by his former teammate, Joe Royle.

Sources
John Hurst at Everton Stats

References

English footballers
England under-23 international footballers
Everton F.C. players
Oldham Athletic A.F.C. players
Sportspeople from Blackpool
1947 births
Living people
Association football midfielders
FA Cup Final players